Wallace Murray may refer to:

 Wal Murray (1931–2004), Australian politician
 Wallace Murray (diplomat) (1887–1965), American diplomat